The Lying Game is a Taiwanese drama broadcast by CTV in 2014, starring Ella Chen, Wu Kang-jen, Lawrence Ko and Vivi Lee. It was broadcast by CTV on October 5, 2014. The drama received an allowance of 2014 high-quality TV program from the Ministry of Culture of Taiwan for NTD 6 million dollars. The original screenplay of this drama was later adapted into the novel "The Lying Game" by the writer "Di Fer". Before the drama will broadcast, the drama was sold to 15 countries, including China, Hong Kong, Macao, Southeast Asia and North America, as well as South Africa and Mongolia, where purchase of Taiwanese drama in previous years was rare.

Broadcast

Cast

Main character
Ella Chen as Sun Zhen (Pretend to Writer X)
Wu Kang-jen as Wei You-liang (Sun Zhen's boyfriend)
Lawrence Ko as Xiao An (Writer X)
Vivi Lee as Hu Xing-ai (Secret love Wei You-liang)

Other actors
Mathilde Lin as Zhou Yi (Sun Zhen's best friend)
Jett Lee as Sun Ping (Sun Zhen's younger brother)
Lu Yi-ching as Sun Zhen and Sun Ping's mother
Milton Jen as Sun Zhen and Sun Ping's father
Tiger Wang as Jiang Qin
Bruce Chen as Chen Wei-hao
Chu Lu-hao as Gao Peng-hsiang (Bad guy of the drama)
Deyn Li as Xu Guo-yong (Sun Ping's friend)

Music

Promotional activity

TV promotion
Kangsi Coming : September 9, 2014

External links

References

2014 Taiwanese television series debuts
China Television original programming